Leonardo Díaz may refer to:

 Leonardo Díaz (footballer) (born 1972), Argentine football goalkeeper
 Leonardo Díaz (parathlete) (born 1975), Paralympic athlete from Cuba
 Leo Díaz (footballer) (born 2000), Argentine footballer

See also
 Leo Díaz (disambiguation)